Priscilla Mensah  (born 19 April 1974) is a Ghanaian footballer who played as a goalkeeper for the Ghana women's national football team. She was part of the team at the 1999 FIFA Women's World Cup. On club level she played for Postal Ladies in Ghana.

References

External links
 

1974 births
Living people
Ghanaian women's footballers
Ghana women's international footballers
Place of birth missing (living people)
1999 FIFA Women's World Cup players
Women's association football goalkeepers